"The Movie" is the 54th episode of the sitcom Seinfeld. It is the 14th episode of the fourth season, and first aired on January 6, 1993 on NBC. The episode revolves entirely around the characters' struggles to go to see a movie together.

Plot
Jerry has two stand-up acts scheduled for the same night; due to a delay in one of them, he cannot make both shows. A hopeful comedian, Buckles, hangs around to fill in when somebody drops out. Jerry agrees to lose his moment at the microphone, as he is meeting his friends to see a movie, CheckMate, at 10:30. On his way to the movie theater, Jerry is grabbed by Buckles, who insists on sharing a taxicab. Buckles irritates Jerry by trying out a new comic routine.

George has been chosen to buy the movie tickets. At the Paragon Theater, George joins the end of a queue. He taps the shoulder of the man in front of him, confirming that he does not have a ticket, which leads him to conclude he is in the line to purchase tickets. Elaine and Kramer join George in line. When Elaine points out that the line is not moving, George gradually discovers that he is in the line to enter the theater. It is now too late to purchase tickets, and they can go instead to see the 10:45 showing at the theater around the corner. Elaine and George purchase tickets at the Multiplex, and Kramer waits to tell Jerry of the change in plans. However, just before Jerry arrives, Kramer runs over to buy a hot dog at the Papaya King.

At the new movie theater, George is interested in another movie there, Rochelle, Rochelle. Elaine struggles to save seats for everyone, and George runs afoul of an usher. Jerry misses his second show after being delayed by his taxi driver. Buckles takes over Jerry's spot and the crowd loves his routine. To make up for it, Buckles takes Jerry to the movies. Everyone but Kramer misses CheckMate and ends up in Rochelle, Rochelle, independently of one-another. After Elaine rips on the movie, Jerry and George discover one another and they leave the movie. Outside, Kramer rejoins them as Checkmate finishes and George has everyone owe him money for the tickets.

Continuity
The fictional film Rochelle, Rochelle ("a young girl's strange, erotic journey from Milan to Minsk") makes its first appearance in this episode. George rents it from a video store in Season 4's "The Smelly Car", and it is turned into a Broadway musical starring Bette Midler in Season 6's "The Understudy".

References

External links 
 

Seinfeld (season 4) episodes
Works set in movie theatres
1993 American television episodes